Jenny Adams (born July 8, 1978 in Tomball, Texas) is an American track and field athlete who specializes in the 100 metres hurdles. She attended the University of Houston.

At the 2001 World Championships in Edmonton, Alberta, Canada, she achieved her personal best time (12.63 seconds) and competed in the long jump as well.

International competitions

References

External links
 

1978 births
Living people
American female hurdlers
American female long jumpers
University of Houston alumni
World Athletics Championships athletes for the United States
Sportspeople from Harris County, Texas
Track and field athletes from Texas
People from Tomball, Texas
Goodwill Games medalists in athletics
Competitors at the 2001 Goodwill Games
21st-century American women